Bloodhounds of Broadway is a 1952 Technicolor musical film directed by Harmon Jones and based on a Damon Runyon story. It stars Mitzi Gaynor along with Scott Brady, Mitzi Green, Marguerite Chapman, Michael O'Shea, Wally Vernon, and George E. Stone. Charles Bronson appears, uncredited, as Charles Buchinski.

The film was remade in 1989, this time as a PBS American Playhouse special (subsequently given theatrical release) starring Matt Dillon and Madonna.

Plot summary

Stackerlee (Mitzi Gaynor) is a country girl who longs to be in show business. A New York bookmaker Foster (Scott Brady) is hiding out in Georgia and meets her and the inevitable happens – he goes straight and she gets her wish.

Cast

Main
 Mitzi Gaynor as Emily Ann Stackerlee
 Scott Brady as Robert 'Numbers' Foster
 Mitzi Green as '52nd Tessie' Sammis
 Marguerite Chapman as Yvonne Dugan
 Michael O'Shea as Inspector McNamara
 Wally Vernon as Harry 'Poorly' Sammis
 George E. Stone as Ropes McGonigle
.

Supporting
 Henry Slate as Dave the Dude
 Edwin Max as Lookout Louie Larchment
 Richard Allan as Curtaintime Charlie

Uncredited

 Sharon Baird as Little Elida
 Herman Boden as Dancer
 Charles Bronson (when he was still using his real name: Buchinski) as Phil Green, aka 'Pittsburgh Philo'
 Timothy Carey as Crockett Pace
 Henry Corden as Selly Bennett
 Van Des Autels as Upstate senator
 Bess Flowers as Nightclub Extra
 A. Cameron Grant as Man on Exercise Horse in Gym
 Al Green as Nightclub Drunk
 Al Hill as Bookie
 Bee Humphries as Apple Annie
 Kenner G. Kemp as Dance Extra
 Robert Long as Presiding senator
 Dayton Lummis as Chairman
 Gregg Martell as Detective Sgt. Kelly
 Edward McNally as Bit
 Joe McTurk as Process server
 Emile Meyer as Skipper
 Harold Miller as Nightclub Extra
 Alfred Mizner as Foy Pace
 Mabel Paige as Madame Moana
 Charles Tannen as Bookie on phone
 Phil Tully as Detective Lt. Moran
 Ralph Volkie as Frankie Ferraccio
 Bill Walker as Uncle Old Fella
 Paul Wexler as Theopolis Pace
 Mary Wickes as Lady at Laundry
 David Bauer as Counsel

References

External links
 
 
 
 

1952 musical comedy films
1952 films
American musical comedy films
Films based on short fiction
20th Century Fox films
Films directed by Harmon Jones
1950s English-language films
1950s American films